Sarıqamış (also, Sarykamysh) is a village in the Neftchala Rayon of Azerbaijan.  The village forms part of the municipality of Mikayıllı.

References 

Populated places in Neftchala District